Marsberg is a town in the Hochsauerland district, in North Rhine-Westphalia, Germany.

History
Although its origins are obscure, Marsberg was a prospering town by the 13th century (it was even minting coins). It was a free city until 1807, when it was incorporated into the Kingdom of Westphalia, until 1813. After two years of independent government, it was added to Prussia in 1815.

Geography
It is situated on the river Diemel, approx. 20 km east of Brilon and 30 km south of Paderborn.

Neighbouring municipalities

 Bad Arolsen
 Bad Wünnenberg
 Brilon
 Diemelsee
 Diemelstadt
 Lichtenau
 Warburg

Town division 
Marsberg consists of the following 17 districts:

 Beringhausen
 Borntosten
 Bredelar
 Canstein
 Erlinghausen
 Essentho
 Giershagen
 Heddinghausen 
 Helminghausen
 Leitmar
 Meerhof
 Niedermarsberg
 Obermarsberg
 Oesdorf 
 Padberg
 Udorf 
 Westheim

International relations

Marsberg is twinned with:
  Lillers (France)

Notable people

 Lissy Ishag  (born 1979), television presenter
 Hubertus Klenner (born 1959), mayor of Marsberg 2004–2014
 Hermann Köhler (born 1950), athlete and Olympic athlete
 Fabian Lamotte (born 1983), footballer
 Peter Lohmeyer (born 1962), actor
 Hans-Joachim Watzke (born 1959), managing director of  Borussia Dortmund

Image gallery

References

External links
 
  

Hochsauerlandkreis